Walram II of Nassau,  ( – 24 January 1276), was Count of Nassau and is the ancestor of the Walramian branch of the House of Nassau.

Life 

Walram was the second son of Count Henry II of Nassau and Matilda of Guelders and Zutphen, the youngest daughter of Count Otto I of Guelders and Zutphen and Richardis of Bavaria (herself daughter of Otto I Wittelsbach, Duke of Bavaria). Walram is first mentioned in a charter dated 20 July 1245.

Walram succeeded his father before 1251, together with his brother Otto I. They received town privileges for Herborn from the German King William in 1251.

Walram and Otto divided their county on 16 December 1255 with the river Lahn as border. The division treaty is nowadays known as the Prima divisio. The area south of the Lahn: the lordships Wiesbaden, Idstein, the Ämter Weilburg (with the Wehrholz) and Bleidenstadt, was assigned to Walram. Nassau Castle and dependencies (Dreiherrische), the Ämter Miehlen and Schönau (Schönau Abbey near Strüth über Nastätten) as well as the Vierherrengericht, Laurenburg Castle, the Esterau (which was jointly owned with the counts of Diez) and the fiefs in Hesse remained jointly owned.
Later, perhaps shortly after the conclusion of the division treaty, Walram expressed dissatisfaction with some provisions of the treaty and challenged them. Whether he was already acting under the influence of the mental illness from which he suffered is unknown. What is certain is that in an attack of insanity he burned his copy of the division treaty.

Walram was Hofmarschall and Geheimrat of King Rudolf I of Germany.

Walram lost several towns, including Niederlahnstein, Pfaffenhofen and Vallendar, to the Archbishop of Trier. He also continued the Dernbacher Feud against Hesse. He died – allegedly in mental derangement – on 24 January 1276. He was succeeded by his son Adolf.

Marriage and children 
Walram married before 1250 to Adelheid of Katzenelnbogen († Mainz, 22 February 1288), daughter of Count Diether IV of Katzenelnbogen and Hildegunde. As a widow Adelheid was a Clarissan nun in Wiesbaden (in the summer) and in Mainz (in the winter). She was buried in the St. Clara monastery in Mainz.
From this union came the following children:
 Diether ( – Trier, 23 November 1307), was Archbishop of Trier 1300-1307.
 Adolf ( – Göllheim, 2 July 1298), succeeded his father as count of Nassau, was King of Germany 1292-1298.
 Richardis (died 28 July 1311), was a nun in the St. Clara monastery in Mainz and later in Klarenthal Abbey near Wiesbaden.
 Matilda (died young).
 Imagina (died before 1276), may have married Frederick of Lichtenberg.

References

Sources 
 
 
 
 
  Table 60.

External links 
 Genealogies of the Middle Ages.
 Nassau in: Medieval Lands. A prosopography of medieval European noble and royal families. Compiled by Charles Cawley

Counts of Nassau
13th-century people of the Holy Roman Empire
1220 births
1276 deaths
Year of birth uncertain